13 Squadron or 13th Squadron may refer to:

Aviation squadrons

 No. 13 Squadron RAAF, a unit of the Australian Royal Air Force
 13th Light Bomber Squadron a World War II unit of the Hellenic Air Force
 No. 13 Squadron RAF, a unit of the United Kingdom Royal Air Force
 13th Bomb Squadron, a unit of the United States Air Force
 13th Fighter Squadron, a unit of the United States Air Force
 13th Reconnaissance Squadron, a unit of the United States Air Force
 13th Space Warning Squadron, a unit of the United States Air Force
 Marine Aviation Logistics Squadron 13, a unit of the United States Marine Corps

Ground combat squadrons

 13th Field Squadron, a unit of the Australian Army

See also

 13th Army (disambiguation)
 13th Division (disambiguation)
 13th Brigade (disambiguation)
 13th Regiment (disambiguation)
 13th Group (disambiguation)
 13th Battalion (disambiguation)